"Om du tror att jag saknar dig" is a Swedish language song by singer Jakob Karlberg. The song was performed for the first time in Melodifestivalen 2020, subsequently being released as a single on 22 February 2020. It was written by Henrik Moreberg, Isak Hallén, Karlberg and Nanne Grönvall. The song was produced by Mattias Andréasson. It peaked at number 70 on the Swedish Singles Chart.

Charts

References

2020 singles
English-language Swedish songs
Melodifestivalen songs of 2020
Swedish pop songs
Songs written by Nanne Grönvall